The Ministry of Tourism and Environment is a department of the Albanian Government in charge of regulation concerning the environment, the sustainable use of natural resources, promotion of renewable resources, protection of nature and biodiversity, sustainable development and management of forestry and pastures, and the quality monitoring of water resources.

Subordinate institutions
 National Environment Agency (AKM)
 National Agency of Protected Areas (AKZM)
 National Tourism Agency (AKT)
 National Coastline Agency (AKB)
 National Forestry Agency (AKP)

Reorganization
 Ministry of Domestic Trade and Tourism (1991–1992)
 Ministry of Tourism (1992–1994)
 Ministry of Construction and Tourism (1994–1996)
 Ministry of Public Works, Territorial Regulation and Tourism (1996–1997)
 Ministry of Trade and Tourism (1997–1998)
 Ministry of Public Works and Tourism (2001–2002)
 Ministry of Territorial Regulation and Tourism (2002–2005)
 Ministry of Tourism, Culture, Youth and Sports (2005–2013)
 Ministry of Economic Development, Tourism, Trade and Enterprise (2013–2017)
 Ministry of Tourism and Environment (2017–present)

Officeholders (1991–present)

See also
 Tourism in Albania

References

Tourism
Albania
Albania
Albania
Water in Albania
Albania
Albania